Children of the Sea may refer to:

Children of the Sea (song), a 1980 song by Black Sabbath
Children of the Sea (manga), a manga series by Daisuke Igarashi
Children of the Sea (film), a film based on the manga
The Nigger of the 'Narcissus', a 1897 novella by Joseph Conrad also known as The Children of the Sea 
Children of the Sea  is an 1872 oil-on-canvas painting by Dutch artist Jozef Israëls.